Simmias was a Macedonian officer, son of Andromenes from Tymphaia and brother of Attalus and Amyntas, the officers of Alexander the Great. He probably served in the division of the phalanx, commanded by his brother Amyntas, as we find him taking the command of it at the battle of Gaugamela during his brother's absence. On this occasion his division was one of those which bore the chief brunt of the battle. In 330 BC he was accused, together with his brothers, of having been concerned in the conspiracy of Philotas; but the vigorous defence of Amyntas before the Macedonian army procured their joint acquittal.

References
Smith, William (editor); Dictionary of Greek and Roman Biography and Mythology, "Simmias (2)", Boston, (1867)

Notes
 

Ancient Macedonian generals
Generals of Alexander the Great
Ancient Tymphaeans
4th-century BC Macedonians